Zarkasih (born c. 1962) was the leader of Jemaah Islamiah (JI), a South East Asian militant group, from 2004 until July 2007 when he was captured. Zarkasih goes by a single name and other aliases including Nuaim, Mbah, Abu Irsyad. As of December 2007, Zarkasih is facing anti-terrorism charges.

Zarkasih is believed to have joined the mujahideen in Afghanistan in the fight against the Soviets. He received military training in Pakistan and has links with al-Qaeda. He became the leader of JI in 2004.

Zarkasih was captured in July 2007 in Yogyakarta by Indonesian police, a few hours after the arrest of JI military commander Abu Dujana.

As of December 2007, Zarkasih and Abu Dujana are facing anti-terrorism charges including conspiracy to commit terrorist attacks, harboring fugitives and possession of illegal weapons and ammunition. They are also accused of shipping weapons and explosives to Sulawesi island to be used for anti-Christian attacks. If convicted, both men could face the death penalty.

References

Jemaah Islamiyah
People imprisoned on charges of terrorism
Indonesian prisoners and detainees
Prisoners and detainees of Indonesia
Living people
Year of birth missing (living people)